Jeffrey Ernest Rosenstock (born September 7, 1982) is an American musician, multi-instrumentalist, singer and songwriter from Long Island, New York. He is known for his former bands Bomb the Music Industry! and The Arrogant Sons of Bitches, as well as for his work as a solo artist and as a composer for Craig of the Creek. He is the founder of Quote Unquote Records, the first donation-based record label.

Early life

Jeff Rosenstock was raised in Baldwin on New York's Long Island. He was born to a Jewish mother who worked as an art teacher and a German Catholic father who worked as a lawyer. Rosenstock identifies as Jewish.

Career
Rosenstock formed his first band, The Arrogant Sons of Bitches (ASOB) in 1995, when he and his friend Joe Werfelman chose not to attend a friend's funeral due to feelings of discomfort, spending the day playing Green Day covers instead. In the midst of ASOB's breakup in 2004, Rosenstock recorded a DIY solo song under the moniker Bomb the Music Industry, which evolved into his next musical project. Bomb the Music Industry became known for their DIY punk ethics and commitment to accessibility, earning a reputation as "the Fugazi for the internet age of punk." Following the release of Bomb the Music Industry's first full-length record, Album Minus Band, Rosenstock founded Quote Unquote Records, the first donation-based record label, distributing all the label's releases digitally through a pay what you want model.

Rosenstock began his solo career in 2012 by releasing his debut solo "mixtape" I Look Like Shit two months after Bomb the Music Industry! had announced their intention to break up. This was followed by the Summer Seven Club project in 2013, which granted purchasers of Rosenstock's 7-inch single "Summer" exclusive access to new songs periodically released over the following months. All the songs from Summer Seven Club were later collected and made available as the Summer + compilation album. Rosenstock's first studio album as a solo artist, We Cool?, was released in 2015. His second solo album, entitled Worry, was released on October 14, 2016. On New Year's Day 2018, Rosenstock's third studio album Post- with 10 tracks was released. His fourth studio album, No Dream, was released on May 20, 2020. A ska version of No Dream, titled Ska Dream was released on April 20, 2021.

Rosenstock has performed with many other ska and punk rock bands, including Mustard Plug, The Bruce Lee Band, and AJJ. He has also performed with his Bomb the Music Industry! band-mates Laura Stevenson and Lee Hartney. Some of his musical influences include Tom Waits, Pulp and The Beach Boys.

He has worked as a producer for other artists such as Mikey Erg, The Smith Street Band, Laura Stevenson, and Dan Andriano. He is also a member of Antarctigo Vespucci, a collaborative project between himself and Fake Problems frontman Chris Farren. Since 2014, he has also been a member of ska band Bruce Lee Band alongside Asian Man Records founder Mike Park.

Since 2018, Rosenstock has composed music for the Cartoon Network series Craig of the Creek. His solo band released a cover of the show's theme song on their 2019 live album Thanks, Sorry! In 2020, the first full musical episode of the show was released, for which Rosenstock wrote all the music and lyrics; the soundtrack was released later that year.

Discography
Solo

The Arrogant Sons of Bitches

Bomb the Music Industry!

Pegasuses-XL
The Midnight Aquarium (2006)
XL (2006)
Pegasuses-XL (2007)
The Antiphon (2008)
Electro Agitators (2009)
Psychic Entourage (2011)

Kudrow
Lando (2009)
Boo (split with Hard Girls) (2011)

Antarctigo Vespucci
Soulmate Stuff (2014)
I'm So Tethered (2014)
Leavin' La Vida Loca (2015)
Love in the Time of E-Mail (2018)

The Bruce Lee Band
Community Support Group (2014)
Everything Will Be Alright, My Friend (2014)
Rental!! Eviction!! (2019)
One Step Forward. Two Steps Back. (2022)

Songwriting Credits
In The Key of the Creek: A Craig of the Creek Musical (2020)

Production Credits
The Smith Street Band: Throw Me in the River (2014)
Dan Andriano in the Emergency Room: Party Adjacent (2015)
Binary Heart: Brighter Days (2015)
Laura Stevenson: Cocksure (2015)
Mikey Erg: Tentative Decisions (2016)
The Smith Street Band: More Scared of You Than You Are of Me (2017)
Walter Etc.: Gloom Cruise (2017)

References

1982 births
Living people
People from Long Island
American people of Jewish descent
Asian Man Records artists
Specialist Subject Records artists
Polyvinyl Record Co. artists
Jews in punk rock